Santa Clarita station is a Metrolink train station in the city of Santa Clarita, California. It is served by Metrolink's Antelope Valley Line between Los Angeles Union Station and Lancaster station. Because the City of Santa Clarita has two other Metrolink stations, this station is sometimes referred to as Soledad Metrolink. City of Santa Clarita Transit offers connecting bus service at the station.

Connections 
City of Santa Clarita Transit:
Local: 5, 6
Station Link: 501, 502
Commuter Express: 796, 797, 799

Kern Transit: 130 to Bakersfield via Frazier Park

Bikeway:
 Santa Clara River Trail- There is a direct connection to the station; the bikeway runs along Soledad Canyon Road across the street on north side of the station.

See also 
Lang Southern Pacific Station a California Historic Landmark

References

External links 

Metrolink stations in Los Angeles County, California
Railway stations in the United States opened in 1992
Santa Clarita, California